The Women's balance beam competition at the 2011 Summer Universiade in Shenzhen, China was held at the Bao'an Stadium on August 16. Yu Minobe and Mai Yamagishi from Japan won the gold and bronze, Guan Wenli from China took the silver.

Medalists

Final Results

References

2011 Summer Universiade events